Thomas H. Bak (originally Tomasz Hieronymus Bąk) (born  27 March 1961 in Kraków, Poland) is a Polish-British cognitive neuroscientist. He is a researcher at the University of Edinburgh whose work centres on the impact of bilingualism on cognitive functions, bilingualism and cognitive function across the lifespan, cross-linguistic studies of aphasia, and the relationship between language, cognition and culture in neurodegenerative brain diseases. He also works on the design and adaptation of cognitive and motor assessments to different languages and cultures.

Early life

Thomas H Bak was born in Kraków (Poland).He studied medicine in the University of Hamburg and obtained his doctorate from the University of Freiburg in Breisgau (Germany).

Research and career 

Thomas Bak joined the cognitive neurology research group at the MRC Cognition and Brain Sciences Unit in Cambridge in 1995.His area of specialisation was interaction between motor and cognitive functions (including language and memory). He established a clinic for the disorders of movement and cognition in Cambridge in 1996.

Since 2006 he has been working in the Department of Psychology, the Centre for Clinical Brain Sciences and the Centre for Cognitive Aging and Cognitive Epidemiology at the University of Edinburgh. In 2008 he established the Edinburgh Interdisciplinary Seminars in Philosophy, Psychology and Language Sciences.

He was the president of the World Federation of Neurology Research Group on Aphasia, Dementia and Cognitive Disorders (2010–2016).

He is best known for his work on the impact of bilingualism on cognitive ageing, in particular the finding that in people who speak two languages (whether from childhood or acquired later in life), dementia is delayed.

Selected publications

References

External links 

 Personal web page
 Report on bilingualism and delayed dementia
 Bak speaks about his research on bilingualism and cognitive ageing

1961 births
University of Hamburg alumni
University of Freiburg alumni
Academics of the University of Edinburgh
British cognitive neuroscientists
Neuropsychologists
Living people
Physicians from Kraków